Nick Chastain was born in Millington, Tennessee. He is an American actor most known for his bad boy role as Alex on the Young and the Restless where he is brought into Genoa City to cause some trouble. He also starred in Without a Trace as Doug, a troubled teen who along with his brother are framed for kidnapping. Nick continues to act in Los Angeles where he lives with his wife Kiana Chastain and has studied from some of the best acting coaches in the city.

Roles
Fast Girl - (2007)
The Young and the Restless - Alex (2004, 2006) (recurring)
The Road To Canyon Lake - The Informant (2005)
Without A Trace - Doug (Season Two, Episode 1) (2003)
Scorched - Stokes (2003)

External links

1981 births
Living people
American male soap opera actors
Male actors from Tennessee